Sledmere is a village in the East Riding of Yorkshire, England, about  north-west of Driffield on the B1253 road.

The village lies in a civil parish which is also officially called "Sledmere" by the Office for National Statistics, although the county council and parish council refer to it as Sledmere and Croome, as the parish also includes the nearby hamlet of Croome.

Local landmarks 

Local points of interest include Sledmere House, a Georgian country house. Built in 1751 by Richard Sykes, the house has remained in the Sykes family since then. It is now the home of Sir Tatton Sykes, 8th baronet.

The Wagoners' Memorial in the village, designed by Sir Mark Sykes, 6th Baronet, is dedicated to the Wolds Wagoners Reserve, a corps that Sir Mark raised from the local population to fight in the First World War. It is noted for its unusual shape and its graphic scenes of war and country life.
The memorial was designated a Grade II listed building in September 1966, but upgraded to Grade I in March 2016.

Sledmere is also the site of the Eleanor Cross, Sledmere, a replica Eleanor cross designated a Grade II listed building in September 1966, but upgraded to Grade I in March 2016.

The 'Sledmere Cross' takes the form of an Eleanor Cross and is a true 'folly' that was 'converted' in 1919 to a War Memorial by Sir Mark Sykes (of the Sykes–Picot Agreement) who added a series of brass portraits in commemoration of his friends and the local men who fell in the war and also notably himself in crusader armour with the inscription “Laetare Jerusalem (Rejoice Jerusalem)”.

East of the village is Sledmere Castle, a folly built around 1790 by John Carr for Sir Christopher Sykes, the 2nd baronet, to enhance the view from Sledmere House.

The church of St Mary is one of the churches on the Sykes Churches Trail. In 1966 the church was designated a Grade II* listed building.

Sledmere was served by Sledmere and Fimber railway station on the Malton and Driffield Railway between 1853 and 1950.

Images of Sledmere

References

External links 

 
 Yorkshire Wolds Villages
 Sledmore estate papers - University of Hull.
 Yorkshire Wolds Wagoners.
  - Radio4 programme presented by Melvyn Bragg on the Wolds Wagoners.

Villages in the East Riding of Yorkshire
Civil parishes in the East Riding of Yorkshire
Folly castles in England